Abdallah Aberkane (born 5 May 2000) is a Dutch professional footballer descent who plays as a centre back for Eerste Divisie club FC Dordrecht.

Club career
Aberkane made his Eerste Divisie debut for Jong Ajax on 10 September 2018 in a game against Jong AZ, as a 65th-minute substitute for Dean Solomons.

In 2019, Aberkane signed for Sparta Rotterdam on an amateur deal. He started playing for the reserve team of Jong Sparta in the Tweede Divisie and even made one appearance for the first team in the Eredivisie; on 21 December 2019 as a late substitute for Dirk Abels in a 3–0 win over AZ. 

In January 2020, Aberkane joined city rivals Excelsior where he signed a contract until 2022.

On 19 January 2023, Aberkane signed for FC Dordrecht on an eighteen-month contract.

Personal life
Aberkane was born in the Netherlands to Moroccan parents.

References

External links
 
 

Living people
2000 births
Dutch sportspeople of Moroccan descent
Association football defenders
Footballers from Gouda, South Holland
Dutch footballers
Netherlands youth international footballers
CVV de Jodan Boys players
ADO Den Haag players
Sparta Rotterdam players
AFC Ajax players
Jong Ajax players
Excelsior Rotterdam players
FC Dordrecht players
Eredivisie players
Eerste Divisie players
Tweede Divisie players